The men's 30 kilometre freestyle mass start cross-country skiing competition at the 2002 Winter Olympics in Salt Lake City, United States, was held on 9 February at Soldier Hollow.

All skiers started at once, making it the first mass start in cross-country skiing in Olympic history. The defending Olympic champion was the Finnish Mika Myllylä, who won in Nagano, but the 30 kilometre event was held in an interval start.

Results

References

Men's cross-country skiing at the 2002 Winter Olympics
Men's 30 kilometre cross-country skiing at the Winter Olympics